Hoplodoris is a genus of sea slugs, dorid nudibranchs, shell-less marine gastropod molluscs in the family Discodorididae.

Species 
Species in the genus Hoplodoris include:

 Hoplodoris armata   Baba, 1993
 Hoplodoris bifurcata   Baba, 1993 
 Hoplodoris bramale  Fahey & Gosliner, 2003
 Hoplodoris estrelyado   Gosliner & Behrens, 1998
 Hoplodoris flammea   Fahey & Gosliner, 2003
 Hoplodoris grandiflora   Pease, 1860
 Hoplodoris hansrosaorum   Dominguez, Garcia & Troncoso, 2006
 Hoplodoris nodulosa   Angas, 1864
Species brought into synonymy
 Hoplodoris desmoparypha Bergh, 1880: synonym of Asteronotus raripilosus (Abraham, 1877)
 Hoplodoris novaezelandiae (Bergh, 1904): synonym of Hoplodoris nodulosa (Angas, 1864)

References

Further reading
 Valdés Á. (2002). A phylogenetic analysis and systematic revision of the cryptobranch dorids (Mollusca, Nudibranchia, Anthobranchia). Zoological Journal of the Linnean Society. 136: 535-636.

Discodorididae